Hampea breedlovei is a species of flowering plant in the family Malvaceae. It is found only in Mexico.

References

breedlovei
Endemic flora of Mexico
Taxonomy articles created by Polbot

Critically endangered flora of North America